Benthophilus pinchuki, Pinchuk's pugolovka, is a species of gobiid fish found along the eastern and western coasts of the Caspian Sea, but absent on the middle part. This species has been recorded along the western coast from the Absheron to Iran, and along the eastern coast near the Cape Bely Bugor (Akdepe, Akpatlawuk), Turkmenistan.

It was described initially as a subspecies of Benthophilus ctenolepidus, but later considered an independent species. The specific name honours the Russian ichthyologist Vitaly Iustinovich Pinchuk (1931–1992) of the USSR Academy of Sciences. In 1979 Pinchuk had collaborated with Ragimov in the description of Benthophilus svetovidovi.

References

Fish of the Caspian Sea
Fish of Western Asia
Benthophilus
Endemic fauna of the Caspian Sea
Fish described in 1982